The Sessions House at Usk, Wales, is a Victorian courthouse by Thomas Henry Wyatt of 1877. It is a Grade II* listed building as of 4 January 1974.

The court is of mauve sandstone with dressings of Bath stone.  It is of five bays, with a cornice, parapet and balustraded terrace. Court Number 2 "survives little altered."
"There is an impressive judge’s chair and the benches retain their original labels for Counsel, Solicitors, Reporters, Jury etc."  A passage under the dock leads through to Usk Prison which stands next door.

The Sessions House was the location for the trial of Margaret Mackworth, 2nd Viscountess Rhondda, a prominent suffragette, in 1913. The case of Josef Garcia, a Spanish seaman, was also reputedly heard there; he was eventually tried and convicted of the murder of William and Elizabeth Watkins of Llangybi and of their three youngest children Charlotte, Alice and Frederick at the Gloucestershire Assizes in 1878.

The building was purchased by Usk Town Council to mark the millennium, and it is now used for meetings of the town council and for community use.

Notes

External links
Information from the local council

Bibliography

John Newman, The Buildings of Wales: Gwent/Monmouthshire, p. 593 

History of Monmouthshire
Grade II* listed buildings in Monmouthshire
Buildings and structures in Monmouthshire
Thomas Henry Wyatt buildings
Usk
Usk